David Leslie Mason  (born 15 March 1939) is a London art dealer and Thalidomide parent activist. He is the father of a daughter, Louise, disabled by thalidomide.

Mason was educated at Highgate School, where he studied under Kyffin Williams.

Role in thalidomide scandal 
Mason's daughter Louise Medus was born in 1962 with stunted arms or legs.

Mason alone refused the initial offered settlement of £3 million by Distillers Company, which was only to be awarded if all the parents agreed. As a result of which he and his daughter suffered harassment and ostracism. His daughter was removed from his care, due to action by his solicitors and other parents supporting settlement, who believed he was not acting in her best interests by refusing settlement. He launched an appeal, which was successful due to evidence of a more substantial settlement in the USA ($2.7m to Shirley McCarrick in Los Angeles). Finally, a Sunday Times story prompted Jack Ashley MP to take up the case in Parliament, and Ralph Nader to organise a boycott of Distillers products in the USA. Distillers increased the offer to £5m and then £20m, which was accepted. The settlement is credited with transforming the lives of British thalidomide victims.

The Thalidomide Trust is now largely funded by Diageo, who bought Distillers and its assets and liabilities.

Mason's book Thalidomide: My Fight was published in 1976. He was awarded the OBE in the 1996 Birthday Honours 'for services to health charities'.

Racing record
Alongside the family art business, in 1957 he began his involvement with motor racing and in the 1970s he became a sponsor of Formula One. After returning to the sport in 2010 he won the Britcar Endurance Championship in 2014, driving a Ferrari 458 with Calum Lockie. For the 2019 Britcar season, Mason returned once again with British GT driver Ross Wylie, driving a Ferrari 488 Challenge. Mason is one of the oldest active racing drivers competing in endurance racing at 80 years old.

24 Hours of Silverstone results

Complete Britcar results 
(key) (Races in bold indicate pole position in class – 1 point awarded just in first race) (Races in italics indicate fastest lap in class – 1 point awarded all races)

References

Further reading 
 A  battle won late, The Independent, 25 August 1997
 Thalidomide: The Fifty Year Fight, BBC, 15 May 2014 (review in The Daily Telegraph)
 Effects of Thalidomide "were horrific", BBC News, 15 May 2014
 Justice must be absolute, Jack Ashley, The Guardian, 10 February 2009

English activists
Living people
People educated at Highgate School
English racing drivers
Britcar drivers
Britcar 24-hour drivers
Officers of the Order of the British Empire
1939 births